Mashhadi Kola may refer to:
 Mashhadi Kola, Babol
 Mashhadi Kola, Sari